This is an inclusive list of science fiction television programs whose names begin with the letter S.

S
Live-action
Salvation (2017-2018)
Salvage 1 (1979)
Sanctuary (2008–2012, Canada)
Sapphire & Steel (1979–1982, UK)
Science Fiction Theatre (1955–1957, anthology)
seaQuest DSV renamed seaQuest 2032 for third season (1993–1996)
Second Hundred Years, The (1967–1968)
Secret Adventures of Jules Verne, The (2000)
Secret Agent Man (2000)
Secret Service, The (1969, UK, puppetry)
Secret World of Alex Mack, The (1994–1998)
Secrets of Isis, The (1975–1977)
Sense8 (2015–2018)
Sentinel, The (1997–1999)
Seven Days (1998–2001)
Shadows (1995–present)
Sharad of Atlantis (1966, film) a.k.a. Undersea Kingdom (1936, film serial)
Shazam! (1974–1977)
Silversun (2004, Australia)
Sir Arthur Conan Doyle's The Lost World (1999–2002, Canada/Australia/New Zealand)
Six Million Dollar Man, The (1974–1978)
Sleepwalkers (1997–1998)
Sliders (1995–2000)
Small Wonder (1985–1989)
So Weird (1999–2001)
Something Is Out There (1988, miniseries)
Space: 1999 (1975–1978, UK)
Space: Above and Beyond (1995–1996)
Space Academy (1977–1979)
Space Cases (1996–1997)
Space Command (1953–1954, Canada)
Space Island One (1998, UK/Germany)
Space Odyssey: Voyage To The Planets (2004, UK, docufiction)
Space Patrol (1950–1955)
Space Patrol (1963–1964, UK) a.k.a. Planet Patrol (US)
Space Precinct (franchise):
Space Police (1986, Space Precinct pilot)
Space Precinct (1994–1995)
Space Rangers (1993)
Spadla z oblakov a.k.a. She Came Out of the Blue Sky (1978–1979, Czechoslovakia)
Sparticle Mystery, The (2011–2013)
Special Unit 2 (2001–2002)
Spectre (1977 film) (1977, UK, film)
Speed Racer (US adaptation) a.k.a. Mach Go Go Go (Japan) (franchise):
Spellbinder (1995, Australia/Poland)
Spider-Man (franchise):
Spider-Man (1978–1979, Japan)
Amazing Spider-Man, The (1977–1979)
Spidey Super Stories (1974–1977)
Stand, The (1994, miniseries)
Star Command (1996, film)
Star Cops (1987, UK)
Star-Crossed (2014)
Star Maidens (1976, UK)
Star Trek (franchise):
Star Trek: The Original Series a.k.a. ST:TOS (1966–1969)
Star Trek: The Next Generation a.k.a. ST:TNG (1987–1994)
Star Trek: Deep Space Nine a.k.a. ST:DS9 (1993–1999)
Star Trek: Voyager a.k.a. ST:VOY (1995–2001)
Star Trek: Enterprise a.k.a. ST:ENT (2001–2005)
Star Trek: Discovery a.k.a. ST:DSC (2017–present)
Star Trek: Short Treks a.k.a. ST:ST (2018–present)
Star Trek: Picard a.k.a. ST:PIC (2020–2023)
Star Trek: Strange New Worlds (2022–present)
Star Wars (franchise):
Star Wars Holiday Special, The (1978, special, film)
Caravan of Courage: An Ewok Adventure (1984, film)
Ewoks: The Battle for Endor (1985, film)
R2-D2: Beneath the Dome (2001, mockumentary)
Star Wars: The Legacy Revealed (2007, special, documentary)
Star Wolf (1978, Japan)
Starflight: The Plane That Couldn't Land a.k.a. Starflight One (1983, film)
Stargate (franchise):
Stargate Atlantis a.k.a. SGA (2004–2009, Canada/US)
Stargate SG-1 a.k.a. SG-1 (1997–2007, Canada/US, ship-based seasons 6–10)
Stargate Universe a.k.a. SGU (2009–2011, Canada/US)
Starhunter (2000–2004, Canada)
Starhyke (2011, UK)
Starlost, The (1973–1974, Canada)
Starman (1986–1987)
Stepford Children, The (1987)
Stingray (1964–1965, UK, puppetry)
Stormworld (2009, Australia/Canada)
Stowaway to the Moon (1975, film)
Strange Days at Blake Holsey High a.k.a. Black Hole High (2002, Canada)
Strange Frequency (2001) IMDb
Strange Luck (1995–1996)
Strange World (1999–2002)
Stranger, The (1964–1965, Australia)
Stranger, The a.k.a. Stranded in Space (1973, film, pilot)
Stranger from Space (1951, UK) IMDb
Stranger Things (2016–present)
Strangerers, The (2000, UK)
Street Fighter (franchise):
Street Hawk (1985)
Super Force (1990–1992)
Super Sentai (franchise):
Himitsu Sentai Gorenger a.k.a. Gorenger a.k.a. Goranger (1975–1977, Japan)
J.A.K.Q. Dengekitai a.k.a. The Jackers (1977, Japan)
Battle Fever J (1979–1980, Japan)
Denshi Sentai Denziman a.k.a. Denjiman, Electric Fighters a.k.a. Denziman (1980–1981, Japan)
Taiyo Sentai Sun Vulcan a.k.a. Sun Vulcan (1981–1982, Japan)
Dai Sentai Goggle-V a.k.a. Dai Sentai Goggle Five a.k.a. Goggle V (1982–1983, Japan)
Kagaku Sentai Dynaman (1983–1984, Japan) a.k.a. Dynaman (US)
Choudenshi Bioman (1984–1985, Japan) a.k.a. Bioman (US/France)
Dengeki Sentai Changeman a.k.a. Changeman (1985–1986, Japan)
Choushinsei Flashman a.k.a. Flashman (1986–1987, Japan)
Hikari Sentai Maskman a.k.a. Maskman (1987–1988, Japan) a.k.a. Bioman 2 (France)
Choujuu Sentai Liveman a.k.a. Liveman (1988–1989, Japan) a.k.a. Bioman 3 (France)
Kousoku Sentai Turboranger a.k.a. Turbo Rangers (1989–1990, Japan)
Chikyu Sentai Fiveman a.k.a. Fiveman a.k.a. Sky Rangers (1990–1991, Japan)
Chōjin Sentai Jetman a.k.a. Jetman (1991–1992, Japan)
Kyōryū Sentai Zyuranger a.k.a. Zyuranger a.k.a. Galaxy Rangers (1992–1993, Japan)
Gosei Sentai Dairanger a.k.a. Dairanger a.k.a. Star Rangers (1993–1994, Japan)
Ninja Sentai Kakuranger a.k.a. Kakuranger a.k.a. Ninja Rangers (1994–1995, Japan)
Chōriki Sentai Ohranger a.k.a. Ohranger (1995–1996, Japan)
Gekisou Sentai Carranger a.k.a. Carranger (1996–1997, Japan)
Denji Sentai Megaranger a.k.a. Megaranger (1997–1998, Japan)
Seijuu Sentai Gingaman a.k.a. Gingaman (1998–1999, Japan)
Kyuukyuu Sentai GoGoFive a.k.a. GoGoFive (1999–2000, Japan)
Mirai Sentai Timeranger a.k.a. Timeranger (2000–2001, Japan)
Hyakujuu Sentai Gaoranger a.k.a. Gaoranger (2001–2002, Japan)
Ninpuu Sentai Hurricaneger a.k.a. Hurricaneger (2002–2003, Japan)
Bakuryū Sentai Abaranger a.k.a. Abaranger (2003–2004, Japan)
Tokusou Sentai Dekaranger a.k.a. Dekaranger (2004–2005, Japan)
Mahou Sentai Magiranger a.k.a. Magiranger (2005–2006, Japan)
GoGo Sentai Boukenger a.k.a. Boukenger (2006–2007, Japan)
Juken Sentai Gekiranger a.k.a. Gekiranger (2007–2008, Japan)
Engine Sentai Go-onger a.k.a. Go-onger (2008–2009, Japan)
Samurai Sentai Shinkenger a.k.a. Shinkenger (2009–2010, Japan)
Tensou Sentai Goseiger a.k.a. Goseiger (2010–2011, Japan)
Kaizoku Sentai Gokaiger a.k.a. Gokaiger (2011–2012, Japan)
Tokumei Sentai Go-Busters a.k.a. Go-Busters (2012–2013, Japan)
Unofficial Sentai Akibaranger a.k.a. Akibaranger (2012–2013, Japan)
Zyuden Sentai Kyoryuger a.k.a. Kyoryuger (2013–2014, Japan)
Ressha Sentai ToQger a.k.a. ToQger (2014–2015, Japan)
Shuriken Sentai Ninninger a.k.a. Ninninger (2015–2016, Japan)
Doubutsu Sentai Zyuohger a.k.a. Zyuohger (2016–2017, Japan)
Uchu Sentai Kyuranger a.k.a. Kyuranger (2017–2018, Japan)
Kaitou Sentai Lupinranger VS Keisatsu Sentai Patranger a.k.a. Lupinranger VS Patranger (2018–2019, Japan)
Super Sentai Strongest Battle (2019, Japan)
Kishiryu Sentai Ryusoulger a.k.a. Ryusoulger (2019–2020, Japan)
Mashin Sentai Kiramager a.k.a. Kiramager (2020–2021, Japan)
Supercar (1961–1962, puppetry)
Supergirl (2015–2021)
Superhuman Samurai Syber-Squad (1994–1995, US Gridman the Hyper Agent adaptation)
Superman (franchise):
Adventures of Superman (1952–1958)
Adventures of Superboy, The (1961, pilot)
Superboy a.k.a. Adventures of Superboy, The (1988–1992)
Lois & Clark: The New Adventures of Superman (1993–1997)
Smallville (2001–2011)
Superman & Lois (2021–present)
Surface (2005–2006)
Survivors (franchise):
Survivors (2008–2010, UK)
Survivors (1975–1977, UK)
Swamp Thing (franchise):
Swamp Thing (1990–1993)
Swamp Thing (2019)

Animation
Saber Marionette (franchise):
Saber Marionette J (1996–1997, Japan, animated)
Saber Marionette J to X (1998–1999, Japan, animated)
Saber Rider and the Star Sheriffs (1987–1988, Japan, animated)
Samurai 7 a.k.a. Samurai Sebun (2004, Japan, animated)
Samurai Jack (2001–2004 2017, animated)
Savage Dragon (1995–1996, animated) IMDb
Sealab 2020 (1972, animated)
Sealab 2021 (2000–2005, animated)
Secret of Cerulean Sand (2002, Japan, animated)
Secret Saturdays, The (2008–2010, animated)
Sectaurs (1985, animated)
Serial Experiments Lain (1998, Japan, animated)
Sgt. Frog (2004–2011, Japan, animated)
Shadow Raiders (1998–1999, Canada, animated)
Sherlock Holmes in the 22nd Century (1999–2001, Scotland, animated)
Sherlock Hound (1984–1985, Japan, animated)
Shin Hakkenden (1999, Japan, animated)
Silent Möbius (1998, Japan, animated)
Silver Surfer (1998, animated)
SilverHawks (1986, animated)
Six God Combination Godmars (1981–1982, Japan, animated)
Sky Commanders (1987, animated)
Skyland a.k.a. Skyland, The New World a.k.a. Skyland, Le Nouveau Monde (French) (2005–2007, France/Canada/Luxembourg, animated)
SKYSURFER Strike Force (1995–1996, animated)
Slugterra (2012–2016, US/Canada, animated)
Snorks (1984–1989, Belgium/US, animated) (elements of science fiction)
Solar Opposites (2020–present, animated)
SoltyRei (2005–2006, Japan, animated)
Sonic the Hedgehog (franchise):
Adventures of Sonic the Hedgehog a.k.a. AoStH (1993, US/France, animated)
Sonic the Hedgehog: The Animated Series a.k.a. Sonic SatAM a.k.a. SatAM (1993–1995, US, animated)
Sonic Underground a.k.a. Sonic le Rebelle (1998–1999, France/US, animated)
Sonic X (2003–2004, Japan, animated)
Space Ace (1965–1966, Japan, animated)
Space Angel (1962–1964, animated)
Space Battleship Tiramisu (2018, Japan, animated)
Space Battleship Yamato a.k.a. Space Cruiser Yamato (franchise):
Space Battleship Yamato (1974–1975, Japan, animated)
Space Battleship Yamato II (1978–1979, Japan, animated)
Yamato: The New Voyage a.k.a. Bon Voyage Yamato (1979, Japan, animated, film)
Star Blazers (1979–1984, Space Battleship Yamato adaptation, US/Japan, animated)
Space Battleship Yamato III (1980–1981, Japan, animated)
Space Battleship Yamato 2199 (2012–2013, Japan, animated)
Space Carrier Blue Noah a.k.a. Thundersub (US/Canada) a.k.a. Nave Anti-Espacial (Spanish) (1979–1980, Japan, animated)
Space Dandy (2014, Japan, animated)
Space Emperor God Sigma (1980–1981, Japan, animated)
Space Kidettes, The (1966–1967, animated) IMDb
Space Pirate Mito (1999, Japan, animated)
Space Runaway Ideon (1980–1981, Japan, animated)
Space Sentinels a.k.a. The Young Sentinels (1977, animated)
Space Stars (1981–1982, anthology, animated) (franchise):
Herculoids, The (1967–1969, 1981–1982, animated)
Astro and the Space Mutts (1981–1982, Jetsons, The spin-off, animated)
Space Ghost (1966–1968, animated)
Space Ghost Coast to Coast a.k.a. SGC2C (1994–2001, Space Ghost parody, animated)
Teen Force (1981–1982, animated)
Cartoon Planet (1995–2000, 2012–2014, Space Ghost Coast to Coast spin-off, animated)
Space Strikers (1995, animated)
Space Warrior Baldios (1980–1981, Japan, animated)
Spaceballs: The Animated Series (2008, animated)
Spaced Out (2002, France/Canada, animated)
Spartakus and the Sun Beneath the Sea a.k.a. Mondes Engloutis, Les (The Engulfed Worlds) a.k.a. Shagma and Arkadia (1985–1987, France, animated)
Special Armored Battalion Dorvack (1983–1984, Japan, animated)
Speed Racer (1967–1968, Japan, animated)
New Adventures of Speed Racer, The (1993–1994, US, animated)
Speed Racer X (1997–2003, Japan/US, animated)
Speed Racer: The Next Generation (2008–2013, US, animated)
Spicy City (1997, anthology, animated)
Spider-Man (franchise):
Spectacular Spider-Man, The (2008–2009, animated)
Spider-Man (1967–1970, animated)
Spider-Woman (1979–1980, animated)
Spider-Man (1981–1982, animated)
Spider-Man and His Amazing Friends (1981–1983, animated)
Spider-man Unlimited (1999–2001, animated)
Spider-Man: The Animated Series (1994–1998, animated)
Spider-Man (2017–2020, animated)
Spider-Man: The New Animated Series (2003, animated)
Ultimate Spider-Man (2012–2017, animated)
Spider Riders (2006–2007, Canada/Japan, animated)
Spiral Zone (1987, animated)
Spliced (2010–2011, Canada, animated)
SpongeBob SquarePants (1999–present, animated) (elements of science fiction in some episodes)
Star Trek (franchise):
Star Trek: The Animated Series a.k.a. ST:TAS (1973–1974, animated)
Star Trek: Lower Decks a.k.a. ST:LOW (2020–present, animated)
Star Trek: Prodigy a.k.a. ST:PRO (2021–present, animated)
Star Wars (franchise):
Star Wars: Droids (1985–1986, US/Canada, animated)
Star Wars: Ewoks (1985–1986, US/Canada, animated)
The Great Heep (1986, Star Wars: Droids sequel, animated)
Star Wars: Clone Wars (2003–2005, animated)
Star Wars: The Clone Wars (2008–2014, 2020, animated)
Lego Star Wars: The Quest for R2-D2 (2009, film, animated)
Lego Star Wars: The Padawan Menace (2011, special, animated)
Star Wars Rebels (2014–2018, animated)
Star Wars Resistance (2018–2020, animated)
Star Wars: The Bad Batch (2021–present, animated)
StarCom: The U.S. Space Force (1987, animated)
Stargate Infinity a.k.a. SGI a.k.a. Infinity (2002–2003, animated)
Starship Operators (2005, Japan, animated)
Starzinger (1978–1979, Japan, animated)
Static Shock (2000–2004, animated)
Steel Jeeg (1976–1976, Japan, animated)
Stellvia (2003, Japan, animated)
Steven Universe (franchise)
Steven Universe (2013–2019, animated)
Steven Universe: The Movie (2019, film, animated)
Steven Universe Future (2019–2020, animated)
Storm Hawks (2007–2009, Canada, animated)
Strain: Strategic Armored Infantry (2006–2007, Japan, animated)
Stratos 4 (2003, Japan, animated)
Street Fighter II V (1995–1996, Japan, animated)
Street Fighter (1995–1997, animated)
Street Sharks (1994–1995, animated)
Strike Witches (franchise):
Strike Witches (2008, Japan, animated)
Strike Witches 2 (2010, Japan, animated)
Stripperella (2003–2004, animated) (elements of science fiction)
Super Friends (franchise):
Super Friends (1973–1974, animated)
All-New Super Friends Hour, The (1977–1978, animated)
Challenge of the Super Friends (1978, animated)
Super Friends (1980–1982, animated)
Super Friends: The Legendary Super Powers Show (1984–1985, animated)
Super Powers Team: Galactic Guardians, The (1985–1986, animated)
World's Greatest Super Friends, The (1979–1980, animated)
Super Hero Squad Show, The (2009–2011, animated)
Super Robot Monkey Team Hyperforce Go! a.k.a. SRMTHFG (2004–2006, US/Japan, animated)
Super Robot Wars (franchise):
Super Robot Wars Original Generation: Divine Wars (2006–2007, Japan, animated)
Superjail! (2008–2014, animated)
Superman (franchise):
New Adventures of Superman, The (1966–1970, animated)
Superman/Aquaman Hour of Adventure, The (1967–1968, animated)
Superman (1988, animated)
Superman: The Animated Series (1996–2000, animated)
Krypto the Superdog (2005–2006, animated)
Superstretch and Microwoman (1979, animated, Tarzan and the Super 7 segment)
Swamp Thing (1991, animated)
SWAT Kats: The Radical Squadron (1993–1995, animated)
Sym-Bionic Titan (2010–2011, animated)
Soldier

References

Television programs, S